Redhill Wood is a  biological Site of Special Scientific Interest west of Newbury in Berkshire.

The site is private land with no public access.

Fauna

The site has the following animals

Invertebrates

Sicus ferrugineus
Poecilobothrus nobilatatus
Clossiana selene
Ectobius lapponicus

Flora

The site has the following Flora:

Trees

Birch
Fraxinus
Tilia
Quercus robur
Hazel
Alder
Castanea sativa
Salix caprea
Cornus sanguinea
Populus tremula
Sambucus nigra
Quercus petraea

Plants

Paris  quadrifolia
Sanicula  europaea
Polygonatum multiflorum
Solidago virgaurea
Melampyrum pratense
Carex strigosa
Dryopteris affinis
Trichocolea tomentella
Hookeria lucens
Leucodon sciuroides
Orthotrichum lyellii
Lecanactis abietina
Mycena clavularis

References

Sites of Special Scientific Interest in Berkshire
Hamstead Marshall